Michael Gazzo (born 21 January 1990), known professionally as Gazzo, is an American DJ, record producer, songwriter, and multi-instrumentalist. Gazzo has written songs across a wide array of styles and for many different artists but is most known for his pop-driven house and dance records. Gazzo grew up in West Caldwell, New Jersey, lived in Baltimore, Maryland, from 2008 to 2013, and now shares time between his house in Los Angeles and a Hoboken, New Jersey apartment.

Gazzo is a pop writer/producer who has cuts with Steve Aoki, Nicky Jam, BTS, Kiiara, Desiigner, Backstreet Boys, Chase Rice, American Authors, Pusha T, and more. He is also currently working with up and coming artists NIKI (88rising), CADE (Ultra), Maty Noyes (Caroline Records), and sad alex (Red Bull Records). Gazzo is best known for his remix of "Best Day of My Life", which collected 50 Mil streams and helped the record go double platinum. He has also done remix work for Fall Out Boy, Ellie Goulding, Jessie J, Billie Eilish, AJR, and many others.

In 2014, Gazzo remixed the song "Best Day of My Life" by American Authors which was certified triple platinum. He went on to have several major artists seek him out for remixes, including Ariana Grande, Fall Out Boy, Billie Eilish. Gazzo has collaborated on remixes with Cash Cash, and has hit #1 on Hype Machine seven times. As a result, Gazzo was chosen as a featured artist on Billboard's "Next Big Sound" indicator.

Early life 
Gazzo was born in Livingston, New Jersey, initially lived in Towaco, New Jersey and at a young age moved to West Caldwell, New Jersey where he began playing upright bass. After moving on to bass guitar, drums, and guitar, he joined and performed with several different bands throughout middle school and high school. Gazzo performed with Children of Bodom at what used to be called Nokia Theater (now PlayStation Theater). He has also played a headlining show at CBGB with Axes for Blackwell, which was his metal band. Gazzo began teaching himself production at 16, and officially began producing in 2011, five years later.

Gazzo would go on to attend college at Towson University where he saw his interest in music turn from a hobby to a career. Gazzo played shows with Tiesto, Steve Aoki, Laidback Luke, Chris Lake, and many other artists, as well as at EDC New York and Las Vegas. Gazzo has officially done 3 or 4 Vapasana Meditation retreats.

He has his cheat days on Sundays and on April 19, 2020, he ran a total of 13 miles even after he decided to only run 2 miles to begin with.

Career 
Gazzo first released "Inspire" featuring Farewell Luna in 2013, quickly followed by his Cage EP, which has been remixed by Jai Wolf and others. Shortly after, he partnered with Kalkutta to remix "We Can't Stop" by Miley Cyrus.

2013–2017 
In 2013, Gazzo gained recognition when "Never Touch The Ground" hit #1 on the Hype Machine Popular Charts less than 24 hours after release, went viral on YouTube and SoundCloud, and was ultimately added to Sirius XM's BPM as a "BPM Breaker". In March 2014 Island Def Jam released his remix for American Authors "Best Day Of My Life" which collected fifty million streams on Spotify. After his first international tour, Gazzo signed to Casablanca Republic Records in October 2014. He was then commissioned to do remixes for Fall Out Boy, Ariana Grande, 2 Chainz/Macklemore, Jessie J, Ellie Goulding, and others. His remix of "Centuries" for Fall Out Boy was played on ESPN College Game Day.

While at Casablanca Records Gazzo released "Sun Turns Cold" with country star Chase Rice, "Rewind" with Kap Slap, "Wasted Love" with Lush & Simon, and "What You Waiting For" with Sugarwhiskey. He also remixed "Hanging Tree", a song from The Hunger Games featuring lyrics and vocals from Jennifer Lawrence.

In 2016, Casablanca Records partnered with Jagermeister for the "Gazzo Evolution" series. Gazzo released a 4-track EP under the same name, Evolution, which was followed by a tour. Later that year, Gazzo remixed "Carol of the Bells" for Jägermeister's Christmas themed vinyl Meister the Holidays.

In 2017, Gazzo co-wrote and composed "Gunshy" with Imanos featuring Pusha T. In May, Gazzo collaborated on Aja9 Radio Disney chart-topping song "Heart Won't Beat". That fall, in collaboration with American Authors, Gazzo released "Good Ol' Boys". Gazzo was a co-writer with Steve Aoki and Lauren Jauregui on "All Night".

Gazzo has also had major music licenses issued to T-Mobile, Boost Mobile, and the movie XXX: Return of Xander Cage.

2018–present 
In 2018, Gazzo began to transition from an electronic artist to a producer/writer, as he stopped touring and began writing and producing for other artists. Gazzo's latest release, a remix of "Six Feet Under" by Billie Eilish, quickly collected millions of streams.

As of late, Gazzo has produced tracks for various artists including desiigner, CADE, Lindsay Stirling, Skylar Stecker, Sammy Adams, and Yoe Mase & Maejor. Since then, Gazzo has also developed new acts including sad alex, aja9, Aidan Alexander, and Emily Vaughn.

In 2018, Yoe Mase's album Soldier hit #18 album on iTunes Alternative charts.

In 2019 Aja9's singles "Treat YoSelf" and "Heart Won't Beat" were both top ten on Radio Disney charts. He also partnered with Red Bull's publishing division 'Toro Rosso Tracks', and signed artist sad alex for production.

In 2019 and 2020, Gazzo did a campaign with Orange Theory Fitness, where he produced a few dozen songs for their 'Year In Review Campaign'.

Discography and credits

Original music

Other contributions

References

American DJs
Record producers from New Jersey
Songwriters from New Jersey
American multi-instrumentalists
Living people
1990 births